Mouhamed Soly (born 25 November 1989 in Dakar) is a Senegalese footballer who plays as a forward.

References

External links

1989 births
Living people
Senegalese footballers
En Avant Guingamp players
Amiens SC players
AS Cannes players
PFC Chernomorets Burgas players
Ligue 2 players
First Professional Football League (Bulgaria) players
Senegalese expatriate footballers
Expatriate footballers in France
Expatriate footballers in Bulgaria
Association football forwards